The 2005 Croatian Cup Final was a two-legged affair played between the Adriatic rivals Rijeka and Hajduk Split. 
The first leg was played in Rijeka on 11 May 2005, while the second leg on 25 May 2005 in Split.

Rijeka won the trophy with an aggregate result of 3–1.

Road to the final

First leg

Second leg

External links
Official website 

2005 Final
HNK Rijeka matches
HNK Hajduk Split matches
Cup Final